Gadek is a state constituency in Malacca, Malaysia, that has been represented in the Malacca State Legislative Assembly.

The state constituency was first contested in 2004 and is mandated to return a single Assemblyman to the Malacca State Legislative Assembly under the first-past-the-post voting system. , the State Assemblyman for Gadek is Shanmugam Pitchay from the Malaysian Indian Congress (MIC) which is part of the state's ruling coalition, Barisan Nasional (BN).

Definition 
The Gadek constituency contains the polling districts of Bukit Sebang, Pekan Pulau Sebang, Kuala Ina, Arongan, Tanjung Rimau, Padang Sebang, Paya Datuk, Pegoh, Ganun and Pekan Gadek.

Demographics

History

Polling distrcits
According to the gazette issued on 31 October 2022, the Gadek constituency has a total of 10 polling districts.

Representation history

Election results

References

Malacca state constituencies